Tangled Threads is a lost 1919 silent film drama directed by Howard Hickman and starring his wife Bessie Barriscale.  Barriscale's production company produced the film and it was distributed by Robertson-Cole Corporation.

Cast
Bessie Barriscale - Margaret Wayne
Rosemary Theby - Rita Kosloff
Nigel Barrie - John Rutherford Wayne
Henry Kolker - Dr. MacGregor
Thomas Holding - Philip Northrop
Ben Alexander - Sonny Boy Wayne
Mary Jane Irving - Little Barbara

References

External links
 Tangled Threads at IMDb.com

1919 films
American silent feature films
American black-and-white films
Lost American films
Films directed by Howard C. Hickman
Silent American drama films
1919 drama films
Film Booking Offices of America films
1919 lost films
Lost drama films
1910s American films
1910s English-language films